On 19 July 1984, Mary Manning, a shop worker in the Henry Street, Dublin (Ireland) outlet of Dunnes Stores, refused to handle the sale of grapefruit from South Africa. Her union, IDATU, had issued directions to its members not to handle South African produce in protest of South African apartheid policies. When Manning and shop steward Karen Gearon continued to refuse to handle South African produce, they were suspended and ten IDATU members working in the store went on strike. 
The additional striking workers were
 Liz Deasy,
 Michelle Gavin,
 Vonnie Munroe,
 Alma Russell,
 Tommy Davis,
 Sandra Griffin,
 Theresa Mooney,
 Cathryn O'Reilly &
 Brendan Barron

While the strike lasted the strikers got only £21 a week strike pay. At first, the strikers received support from few individuals and groups, such as Nimrod Sejake, but they were encouraged when Archbishop Desmond Tutu met with the strikers on his way to receive the Nobel Peace Prize and invited them to visit South Africa. Eight of the strikers travelled to South Africa in 1985, but were not permitted to enter the country. Their deportation from South Africa received extensive news coverage in Ireland.

The strike lasted until April 1987 when the Irish government banned the import of South African goods. The ban came about as a result of public pressure in support of the strikers and was the first complete ban of South African imports by a Western government.

Recognition
The workers eventually met Nelson Mandela on the occasion of his conferral of the Freedom of the City of Dublin in 1990. Mandela said that the strikers demonstrated to South Africans that "ordinary people far away from the crucible of apartheid cared for our freedom" and helped him keep going when he was in prison. A plaque, presented by South African President Thabo Mbeki, commemorating the action was unveiled in Dublin in June, 2008, and a street has been named after Mary Manning in Johannesburg. Manning was invited to attend the funeral of Nelson Mandela in 2013. Sean MacBride, a winner of the Nobel Peace Prize attended at least one of the strikes in May 1985.

Ewan MacColl wrote a song about the strike, titled 'Ten young women and one young man', for a concert in Dublin. Christy Moore sings the song 'Dunnes Stores' written by Sandra Kerr about the strike. In 2014, a documentary about the strike, Blood Fruit, was released. A play Strike! by Tracy Ryan is for production at the Southwark Playhouse in Spring of 2023.

References

1984 labor disputes and strikes
1984 in Ireland
1980s in Dublin (city)
Boycotts of apartheid South Africa
Labour disputes in Ireland
Nelson Mandela
Ireland–South Africa relations